Janelle Mary Lindsay, OAM (born 12 December 1976)  is an Australian Paralympic tandem cycling pilot. She was born in the New South Wales city of Bathurst. She piloted Lindy Hou for sprints and kilo events  at the 2004 Athens Games.  At the  games, she won a gold medal in the Women's Sprint Tandem B1–3 event and a bronze medal in the Women's 1 km Time Trial Tandem B1–3 event.

References

Australian female cyclists
Paralympic cyclists of Australia
Cyclists at the 2004 Summer Paralympics
Medalists at the 2004 Summer Paralympics
Paralympic gold medalists for Australia
Paralympic bronze medalists for Australia
Paralympic sighted guides
Sportswomen from New South Wales
Recipients of the Medal of the Order of Australia
1976 births
Living people
Paralympic medalists in cycling
20th-century Australian women
21st-century Australian women